Sacred Heart Canossian College (Chinese: 嘉諾撒聖心書院; abbr: 'SHCC') is a Catholic, all-girls' school established at Robinson and Caine Roads, Mid-Levels, Hong Kong. Founded in 1860, the school currently serves under 2,000 students and has been identified as one of the most prestigious schools in Hong Kong.

History
Sacred Heart Canossian College was founded by the Canossian Sisters of Charity soon after they first arrived in 1860; the order's founder, Magdalena of Canossa was subsequently canonised. It was one of Hong Kong first girls' schools established during the British colonial period. Originally called 'Italian Convent School,' the school housed around 40 students. The medium of instruction was in English, Italian, with Chinese introduced later as 98% of the local populace at the time was Han Chinese. A sister college, Sacred Heart Canossian College was also established at around the same time in the neighbouring Portuguese colony of Macau, and there the language of instruction was predominantly Portuguese. The first headmistress of the school was Sister Emily Aloysia Bowring, daughter of the fourth Governor of Hong Kong, Sir John Bowring. She served from 1860 to 1870.

In 1960, the school was renamed 'Sacred Heart Canossian College' (SHCC), to differentiate from other schools in Hong Kong. Originally, the school only educated girls at least six years of age. The school has a primary as well as a secondary sections. At that time, SHCC occupied a vast stretch of land spanning from Robinson Road to Caine Road at Mid-Levels, an affluent area in Hong Kong. Thus, many of its students are from middle-class families and also this is the school of choice for parents who worked with the Hong Kong Government. In 1981 the secondary section of the school moved to Pokfulam but the primary section remained at Robinson Road, Mid-Levels, Hong Kong. The primary section moved to a temporary accommodation until returning into Caine Road in 1992. The primary school has subsequently changed its name to Sacred Heart Canossian School Private Section.

SHCC is regarded as one of the prestigious schools in Hong Kong. Over the years, it has a number of graduates that have grown to prominence including former Associate Governor of Hong Kong Anson Chan; former Attorney General Elsie Leung; and Selena Tsang, the wife of former Chief Executive Donald Tsang.

Campus
The original campus was located in Caine Road, Mid-Levels, Hong Kong. In 1981, the secondary section moved to its present location in Pokfulam, Hong Kong. The campus occupies an area of 6400 square metres on a verdant hillside, overlooking East Lamma Island, an outlying island adjacent to Hong Kong Island.

The campus consists of three blocks of buildings and playgrounds. The school has 38 classrooms, 7 sciences laboratories, one multi-media learning centre, 2 visual arts rooms, a Teachers' Learning & Resources Centre, a Students' Learning & Research Centre, 3 computer rooms, 9 special rooms, 2 counselling rooms, a Student Council office, a health care room, history corner, school hall, library with the German corner, car park, tuck shop, chapel.

In 2006, the school campus is expanded with the construction of the St. Magdalene Block. The St. Magdalene Block has a video conference Room, the self-access learning centre (SALC), the computer assisted learning centre, the campus TV Studio, the staff common room, the school publications room and the religious room. The self-access learning centre is located on 3/F of the St. Magdalene Block, which is for students to learn through audio books, DVDs and have group discussions.

Administration
SHCC is partially funded by the Government as a Grant-in-Aid School. Under the School Management Initiative, the school is managed by a School Management Committee, which consists of members of the Institute of Canossian Sisters of Charity Inc., the Principal, a teacher representative, a representative from the Alumni Association, and parents' representatives. This committee is ultimately responsible for all school policies.

Curriculum
The secondary school had a total of 38 classes: 6 classes at each level from Form 1 to 5; plus two arts-stream classes and two science-stream classes in Forms 6 and 7. There are an average of 42 students per class in Forms One to Three, and approximately 35–40 students per class in Forms 4 and 5.

In Forms 1 to 3, students are approximately divided into two main groups according to their academic performance in mathematics and language proficiency. Students are then assigned to different classes towards science related or arts related curriculum. This is not to discriminate against the academically less-inclined students, but to enable the better use of resources and teaching strategies. To meet the needs of students, remedial classes are conducted with smaller class size to facilitate maximum teacher-student interaction so as to attain a higher educational efficiency.

The spirit of collaborative learning is encouraged in all classes. Students engage in group projects to foster their peer and team learning attitude and competence.

Students are offered a variety of subjects in the secondary curriculum and in particular from Form 4 Form 7 to promote lifelong learning.

It was noted that, in general like many of the prestigious schools in Hong Kong, there is a general deteriotion of standards post 1997, when Hong Kong returned to the People's Republic of China.

However, there was a new curriculum started from 1 September 2010. The secondary school has a total of 36 classes: 6 classes at each level from Secondary1 to 6.

In Secondary 1 to 2, students have to take 14 classes, and for secondary 3 students, they have to take 18 classes. In Secondary 4 to 6, students have to take 4 core subjects (English, Chinese, Mathematics and Liberal Studies) and 3 other subjects as elective subjects in the New Senior Secondary (NSS) 334 Scheme curriculum.

Academic performance
Religious education remained the core subject to be learned alongside mainstream subjects throughout the school curriculum. To encourage a well-rounded development of its students. In most cases, students took nine subjects at the HKCEE level. Historically, SHCC has been known for its academic excellence, with a good track record of students excelling at public examinations.

Most SHCC's graduates continue their studies at the university level in Hong Kong. Over the years, an remarkable number of its graduates have been admitted to some of the world's most prestigious universities, including the Oxford University, the McGill University, the Columbia University, the Cambridge University, the University of Chicago, the University of London, University of British Columbia, the University of Toronto, the University of California, MIT, the University of Melbourne, and the Monash University.

Thanks to the generosity of various local organisations and past students, a great number of scholarships are offered to students with good academic performance. Clubs such as Debating Society, Science Society, Chinese Culture Society, Maths Club, Economics Society provide the opportunity to students to put their academic knowledge into practice.

Extra-curricular activities
SHCC is well known for its excellence in Discipline, Mastering of languages, Arts, Dance, Music and Sports. Sacred Heart Canossian College has been the Girls School Second Runner-up of the BOCHK Bauhinia Bowl Award since 2005, following Heep Yunn School and Diocesan Girls' School.

Subjects
Form 1 to Form 3:
Chinese Languages, English Languages, Mathematics, Religious and Moral Education, Chinese History, Integrated Science (Form 1 to 2), Physics, Chemistry, Biology (Form 3), Geography, History, Putonghua, Computer, Music, Physical Education (include P.E and Dance in Form 1 and Form 2, Swimming for Form 3), Home Economics (include cooking and sewing), Visual Arts, Drama (for Form 1 and Form 2), Life & Society
S1 to S4 (starting from 1 September):
English Language, Chinese Language, Mathematics, Religious and Moral Education, Music, Physical Education, Visual Arts.
S5 to 6:
English Language, Chinese Language, Mathematics, Liberal Studies.

For HKCEE
Form 4 to Form 5:

Chinese Languages, English Languages, Mathematics, Religious and moral education, Chinese History, English Literature, Geography, History, Economics, Additional Mathematics, Biology, Chemistry, Physics, Accounting, Computer, Home Economics, Visual Arts, Music, Physical Education

For HKALE
Form 6 to Form 7:

Chinese Languages and Literature, English Languages and Literature, Mathematics, Religious and moral education, Psychology, Geography, History, Economics, Biology, Chemistry, Physics, Music, Physical Education

For HKDSE
S4 to S6:

4 Core Courses; Chinese Languages, English Languages, Mathematics and Liberal Studies. Other required courses; Physical Education, Music (S4), Visual Arts (S4) and Religious and Moral Education. 3 Elective Courses; Chinese History, Chinese Literature, English Literature, Geography, History, Economics, Mathematics Extension Module 1 (Calculus and Statistics), Mathematics Extension Module 2 (Algebra and Calculus), Biology, Chemistry, Physics, Business Accounting and Financial Studies, Information and Communication Technology, Ethics and Religious Studies

Houses 
The six houses are named after six well-known, successful women in the history. Students are randomly assigned into different houses during admission and are allocated permanently.

Student organizations
 Student Council(SC)
 Alumnae Association (AA)
 Parents & Teacher Association (PTA)
 Discipline Prefect
 Library Prefect
 Counselling Team
 I.T. Prefect
 Moral & Civic Education Team
 Sex Education Team
 Careers and Further Studies Team (CFST)
 School Stage Management Team
 Campus TV
 Music Society
 Sport Society
 Head Girl Core Group
 Visual Arts Team

Notable alumni

Politics and civil service
 Anson Chan (陳方安生) – Former Chief Secretary for Administration of Hong Kong and former Legislator Councillor.  Former Associate Governor of Hong Kong.
  (任關佩英) – Former Commissioner, Independent Commission Against Corruption of the Hong Kong, reported directly to the Governor of Hong Kong.
 Dr. Annie Wu Suk Ching, SBS, JP (伍淑清) – Member of the Standing Committee of the National Committee of Chinese People's Political Consultative Conference.
 Elsie Leung (梁愛詩) – Former Secretary for Justice (Attorney General) of Hong Kong. Member of the Executive Committee of the People's Republic of China.
 Tanya Chan Suk chong (陳淑莊) – Legislative Councillor (Geographical constituency, Hong Kong Island), member of Central and Western District Council of Hong Kong (Peak Constituency), founding member of the Civic Party of Hong Kong (one of the two major political parties in Hong Kong).

Commerce
Loretta Yam Yin Chun (任燕珍) – Cluster CEO (HK East Cluster) and Hospital CEO of both St. John Hospital and the Pamela Youde Nethersole Eastern Hospital, two highly respected hospitals in Hong Kong.
:Margaret Leung (梁高美懿) – Former Vice-chairman, chief executive officer of Hang Seng Bank Ltd. and the Group general manager and Global Co-head of Commercial banking of HSBC.
Rose Lee Wai-man (李慧敏) Vice-chairman, chief executive officer of Hang Seng Bank Ltd.
 (陳碧鏵) – Former Chief Executive Octopus Cards Limited, Former general manager of Television Broadcasts Limited (International)

Education and academia
 Rosie Young (楊紫芝) – Former Pro-Vice-Chancellor of the University of Hong Kong, Chairman of the Medical Council of Hong Kong, Member of the Hospital Authority of Hong Kong, Council Member of the Royal Australian College of Physicians and CEO of the Sydney Hospital in Sydney, Australia.

Arts and entertainment
 Eleanor Morris (莫何敏儀) – Veteran journalist, Vice-President of Children's Cancer Foundation
 Alice Mak (麥家碧) – Artist and cartoonist. She is the author of the two most popular cartoon characters in Hong Kong; McMug (麥嘜) and Mcdull (麥兜).
 (黎堅惠) – Designer, journalist and blogger. Winifred Lai's Blog
 (郭藹明) – Actress, 1991 Miss Hong Kong winner
 (潘芝莉) – Actress, 1996 Miss Hong Kong first runner-up
 (陳奕詩) – Actress, 1986 Miss Asia Pageant
Lan Sai (蘭茜) – DJ, actress
Kitty Yuen (阮小儀) – DJ
 Virginia Lung (龍慧祺) – Interior designer, founder of One Plus Partnership Limited.
Adeline Yen Mah – Author of Falling Leaves and her bestseller Chinese Cinderella

Sports
Stephanie Au Hoi-Shun (歐鎧淳) – Athlete, two-time swimmer, winner of the 24th Hong Kong Outstanding Students Awards
Janet Yu Wai Ting (于蕙婷) – Athlete, swimmer from Hong Kong, part of Hong Kong's bronze medal-winning 400 Free Relay

Associated schools and hospitals
The order Canossian Sisters of Charity (嘉諾撒仁愛修會) has founded hospitals and a number of schools in the South East Asia, particularly in Hong Kong and Macau. The following is an inexclusive list:
St. Francis' Canossian College  (嘉諾撒聖方濟各書院)
St. Mary's Canossian College  (嘉諾撒聖瑪利書院)
Holy Family Canossian College  (嘉諾撒聖家書院)
Pui Tak Canossian College  (嘉諾撒培德書院)
Sacred Heart Canossian School Private Section  (嘉諾撒聖心學校私立部)
Sacred Heart Canossian College of Commerce  (嘉諾撒聖心商學書院)
Sacred Heart Canossian College, Macau (嘉諾撒聖心女子中學)
Canossa Hospital, Hong Kong
Sacred Heart Canossian School(嘉諾撒聖心學校)

References

External links

 Sacred Heart Canossian College's official website

Pok Fu Lam
Southern District, Hong Kong
Girls' schools in Hong Kong
Catholic secondary schools in Hong Kong
Educational institutions established in 1860
Canossian educational institutions
1860 establishments in the British Empire